Suzie Yeung (born June 12, 1991) is an American voice actress who has done work for Sound Cadence Studios, Funimation, Bang Zoom! Entertainment, Studiopolis and SDI Media. She is known for playing Yuffie Kisaragi in Final Fantasy VII Remake, Eula in Genshin Impact, Makima in Chainsaw Man, Kaban and Lucky Beast in Kemono Friends, Vladilena "Lena" Milizé in 86, Miraschon in JoJo's Bizarre Adventure: Stone Ocean, Sakura Element in Re:Zero: The Prophecy of the Throne, and Kumiko Yamamura/Josee in Josee, the Tiger and the Fish.

Yeung mentioned she was born in Maine but grew up in Boston, Massachusetts. She studied Sociology at Smith College and worked as a higher education manager before becoming a full time voice actress. Her family is originally from Hong Kong. She can speak Cantonese and Mandarin Chinese and has done voice-over works in both languages.

Filmography

Anime

Animation

Film

Video games

References

External links 

 
 
 

1991 births
Living people
American voice actresses
21st-century American actresses
American video game actresses
Actresses of Asian descent
American people of Hong Kong descent